SiriusXM Urban View is an African American talk radio channel on XM Satellite Radio 126 (previously 128). The subjects cover those relevant to the black community such as: politics, economics, or social issues.

The channel was originally programmed by Radio One, Inc., a Washington, D.C.-based company specializing in African American and urban radio formats. Radio One originally programmed four other music channels for XM, but XM has since taken control of those channels and removed all commercials.

History
In August 2007, Radio One overhauled The Power's daytime programming by affiliating it with its Syndication One subsidiary, the company's syndication arm. Radio programs Keeping it Real with Rev. Al Sharpton, 2 Live Stews, and The Warren Ballentine Show were added to the scheduled on 2007-08-13. We Ourselves and Studio B are no longer heard on XM Radio, and Make it Plain can be heard on SiriusXM Progress (SiriusXM channel 127).

A couple months later, Syndication One announced that it would be folding its unit, and several of their programs would be canceled. One of these, the 2 Live Stews, was signed by Sporting News Radio.

On January 1, 2008, XM Satellite Radio gained full control of The Power from Radio One, Inc.  On January 7, 2008, GW on the Hill, Spirit, and Digital Spin are no longer heard on The Power.  Also, all weekend programming and programming after 4 PM ET on weekdays has been suspended.  Since this event, XM has added many shows specifically targeted to African-Americans from commercial and public radio.

As of February 2013, The Power has been renamed Urban View and as of May 9, 2013, Urban View is now on channel 126.

Shows
The following shows air on The Power.

Madison, The Black Eagle
 The Warren Ballentine Show
Keeping It Real with Al Sharpton 
2 Live Stews (3 hour delay)
The Kojo Nnamdi Show
Urban Journal
Armstrong Williams
Living on Earth
The Changing World
Blackanomics

Tavis Smiley
Mind Yo Business
On With Leon
Willie Jolley
GW On the Hill
Rob Redding
Digital Spin
The Maggie Linton Show
Blackpolicy.org
Greatness By Design
Karen Hunter

References
Notes

External links
 The Power on XM Radio
 The Power Schedule Grid

Sirius XM Radio channels
News and talk radio stations in the United States
Urban One
XM Satellite Radio channels
Radio stations established in 2001